Marcos Rogério Ricci Lopes (born 14 February 1986), commonly known as Pará, is a Brazilian professional footballer who plays as a right back for Portuguesa.

Pará previously played for Santo André, Santos, Grêmio and Flamengo winning multiple titles such as Copa do Brasil and Copa Libertadores.

Club career

Santo André
Born in São João do Araguaia, Pará, Pará worked as a bricklayer in his hometown before being invited to a trial at São Paulo at the age of 13. After nothing came of it, he started his career at Barcelona Esportivo Capela, before joining Santo André in 2003.

Promoted to the first team in the 2004 season, Pará failed to make an appearance during the campaign, but established himself in the main squad over the years, being utilized in both flanks and often as a midfielder. He was on the squad who won the 2004 Copa do Brasil and the 2008 Campeonato Paulista Série A2.

Santos
On 30 August 2008, Pará signed a short-term deal with Série A side Santos. He made his top tier debut four days later, coming on as a substitute for Nelson Cuevas in a 2–0 home defeat of Vitória.

Pará scored his first goal for the club on 20 September 2008, but in a 4–1 away loss against Goiás. He contributed with 12 appearances (all as a midfielder) for the club during his first season, as Peixe nearly avoided relegation.

From the 2010 season onwards, Pará became a regular starter in the right back, playing in the squad led by Neymar and winning multiple Campeonato Paulista titles, the 2010 Copa do Brasil, the 2011 Copa Libertadores and finishing runners-up in the 2011 FIFA Club World Cup.

Grêmio

On 28 February 2012, after falling down the pecking order due to the arrival of Jorge Fucile and the return of Maranhão, Pará was loaned to fellow top tier side Grêmio until the end of the year. An undisputed starter during the season, he contributed with 54 appearances overall as his team finished third.

On 9 January 2013, Pará was again presented at Grêmio, after agreeing to a permanent three-year contract with the club.

Flamengo
On 7 January 2015, Pará was loaned to Flamengo for one year; the loan was mainly a part of a debt discharge for Rodrigo Mendes' signing in 2000. Initially a backup to longtime incumbent Léo Moura, he became a first-choice during the campaign as the latter left to join Fort Lauderdale Strikers.

On 16 May 2017 Pará extended his contract with Fla until December 2019.

Return to Santos
On 3 August 2019, Santos announced the return of Pará to the club, after agreeing to a contract until December 2020. On 30 October 2020, he renewed his link until December 2022.

On 9 December 2021, after 292 matches for the club, Pará terminated his contract with Santos.

Cruzeiro
Just hours after leaving Santos, Pará was announced at Série B side Cruzeiro for the 2022 campaign, after agreeing to a pre-contract with the club. On 30 December, after Ronaldo bought the club and turned it into a SAF (Sociedade Anônima do Futebol), he reached an agreement with the board and rescinded his pre-contract.

Later career
On 6 April 2022, Pará signed for Brusque in the second division until the end of the year. On 8 December, after the club's relegation, he was announced at Portuguesa.

Career statistics
.

Honours

Club
Santo André
Copa do Brasil: 2004
Campeonato Paulista Série A2: 2008

Santos
Campeonato Paulista: 2010, 2011
Copa do Brasil: 2010
Copa Libertadores: 2011

Flamengo
 Campeonato Carioca: 2017, 2019

References

External links

Pará at Portal Oficial do Grêmio. 

1986 births
Sportspeople from Pará
Brazilian footballers
Esporte Clube Santo André players
Santos FC players
Grêmio Foot-Ball Porto Alegrense players
CR Flamengo footballers
Brusque Futebol Clube players
Associação Portuguesa de Desportos players
Campeonato Brasileiro Série A players
Campeonato Brasileiro Série B players
Living people
Association football defenders